CS Dinamo București is a Romanian sports society based in Bucharest.

History 

The club was founded in 1948, after the merge of Unirea Tricolor MAI with Ciocanul București.

References

External links 
 

 
Sports clubs established in 1948
Multi-sport clubs in Romania
Sports clubs in Romania
Sport in Bucharest

pl:Dinamo Bukareszt